Diospyros rigida is a tree in the family Ebenaceae. The twigs are greyish black. The specific epithet  is from the Latin meaning "stiff or rigid", referring to the leaves. Habitat is lowland mixed dipterocarp forests. D. rigida is found in Sumatra, Peninsular Malaysia and Borneo.

References

rigida
Plants described in 1873
Trees of Sumatra
Trees of Peninsular Malaysia
Trees of Borneo